Michalis Karchimakis (born on 9 November 1957 in Siteia, Crete, Greece) is a Greek politician of the Panhellenic Socialist Movement (PASOK). Since 9 October 2009 to 17 May 2012 he has been the Deputy Minister for Agricultural Development and Food, and from 14 September 2010 General Secretary of PASOK.

Life
Michalis Karchimakis was born on 9 November 1957 in Siteia, Crete. He graduated from the Law School of the National and Kapodistrian University of Athens with a major in Political Sciences, and completed his studies with a Post-Graduate degree in Regional Development at Panteion University.

Michalis Karchimakis became a member of the PA.SO.K. upon its foundation in 1974. He was firstly elected as a Member of the Hellenic Parliament in 1996, in his home  prefecture of Lasithi, but lost his seat after an appeal in the electoral court. He was re-elected in the national elections of 2000, 2004, 2007 and 2009.

From 1993 until 1995, he served as a special advisor to then-Prime Minister Andreas Papandreou. In 1999 he was appointed as the PA.SO.K.'s deputy secretary of the agricultural section. From 2004 until 2007, he served in numerous party councils, including the Defence Committee of the PA.SO.K.'s parliamentary group as well as the anti-corruption section of the Party.

After the October 2009 elections, Michalis Karchimakis was appointed as the Deputy Minister for Agricultural Development and Food. In September 2010, he was nominated and elected as the chairman of the PA.SO.K.'s National Council.

See also
 PA.SO.K.

References
 Biography of M.P. Michalis Karchimakis

External links
 Official Website of M.P. Michalis Karchimakis 

1957 births
People from Sitia
PASOK politicians
Government ministers of Greece
Living people
Greek MPs 1996–2000
Greek MPs 2000–2004
Greek MPs 2004–2007
Greek MPs 2007–2009
Greek MPs 2009–2012
Greek MPs 2012 (May)